is a Japanese former Nippon Professional Baseball pitcher.

References 

1966 births
Living people
Baseball people from Ōita Prefecture 
Japanese baseball players
Nippon Professional Baseball pitchers
Nankai Hawks players
Fukuoka Daiei Hawks players
Hanshin Tigers players
Osaka Kintetsu Buffaloes players
Tohoku Rakuten Golden Eagles players
Managers of baseball teams in Japan